The Lister Storm was a homologated GT racing car manufactured by British low volume automobile manufacturer Lister Cars with production beginning in 1993. The Storm used the largest V12 engine fitted to a production road car since World War II, a 7.0 L Jaguar unit based on the one used in the Jaguar XJR-9 that competed at the 24 Hours of Le Mans. Due to the high price of the vehicle at £220,000, only four examples were produced before production of the road-going Storm ceased. Only three Storms survive today, although the company continues to maintain racing models. The Storm was the fastest four-seat grand tourer during the 1990s and early 2000s.

Racing

Storm GTS
The Lister Storm GTS debuted at the 1995 24 Hours of Le Mans as a competitor in the GT1 class, going up against cars such as the McLaren F1 GTR, Ferrari F40 LM, Jaguar XJ220S, and the Porsche 911 GT2. The car, driven by Geoff Lees, Rupert Keegan, and Dominic Chappell, did not perform well, failing to finish due to gearbox failure after 40 laps.

In 1996, the team signed a sponsorship deal with football club Newcastle United and hired engineer Geoff Kingston. It decided to give an updated Storm an early test for Le Mans by entering a lone car in the 24 Hours of Daytona, driven by ex-F1 drivers Geoff Lees, Tiff Needell and Kenny Acheson. It failed to finish due to a high-speed crash while Acheson was behind the wheel. The car was destroyed and according to an interview in Octane in November 2020, Kenny suffered from temporary vision loss in his right eye, chest injuries, a broken rib and still suffers from a reduced lung capacity on the left side.

Even with this letdown, the team pushed on towards Le Mans with the Storm GTS. A new car had to be built by G-Force due to the timescales involved. Lees and Needell were joined by Anthony Reid. The car was able to improve on its disappointing start by finishing the race in 1996, although it was classified in 19th place, 59 laps behind the winner. Lister decided after Le Mans that they would enter the Storm GTS into the BPR Global GT Series, debuting in the fifth round at the Nürburgring but sadly retiring while in third place. The car was then entered at the Suzuka 1000km with Christophe Bouchut this time joining Lees and Needell. It was running in third, before retiring thanks to gearbox troubles.

The car once again proved its speed during round eight of the 1996 BPR Global GT Series at Brands Hatch, qualifying third overall. It sadly retired, this time with an engine issue, while still in that third position.

Storm GTL
For 1997, Lister realized that the Storm GTS was too slow in comparison to some of the newer GT1 class competitors, such as the Mercedes-Benz CLK GTR and Porsche 911 GT1. The Storm was therefore redesigned, with a longer and more aerodynamic front end added to the existing car. This car was referred to as the Storm GTL and also used a carbon fibre structure and body panels. The car debuted at the 24 Hours of Daytona, where it managed to take 19th place overall and fourth in its class. Later that year, for Le Mans, two new Storm GTLs were entered, but neither of them was able to finish, with both cars out of the race by lap 77. Later in the year, a Storm GTL would travel to the United States to participate in the final two rounds of the FIA GT Championship at Sebring and Laguna Seca. The car failed to finish both races. It did take one race win and one second place, both results at Donington Park, in the 1997 British GT Championship, however.

1998 saw the team again attempt Daytona, but again they suffered problems early on, and did not finish. Updates to the car meant that it failed scrutineering and was not allowed to take part in the 1998 24 Hours of Le Mans despite the team entering the event and turning up to pre-qualify. One bone of contention was the lack of a rear window in the refreshed design.

Also in 1998, the Lister Storm GTL finished fifth overall  in the British GT Championship in the hands of Tiff Needell and Julian Bailey (with Anthony Reid subbing for Tiff at the Circuit de Spa-Francorchamps round). There were three Storm GTLs entered this season and between them they achieved two victories and seven podiums including winning the Silverstone Golden Jubilee Trophy race.

An updated version of the car – featuring a longer nose design – won the overall 1999 British GT Championship driven by Jamie Campbell-Walter and Julian Bailey, winning seven races that season. The championship result was contentious, with a furore surrounding changes to the rear aerodynamics of the Storm GTL. Multiple protests were launched against the car by the rival Blue Coral Porsche team and the championship results remained provisional until after the season had ended. This was futile, and the Lister was victorious.

Meanwhile, the Storm GT also won the GT2 category of the championship that same year. It became apparent that the GT1 rules were going to disappear and that Lister was very competitive in GT2, which was to become the leading class in 2000. Thus, the end of the GTL.

Storm GT

For 1999, the Storm reappeared, a reworked version of the earlier GTS. The car had lost the aerodynamic bodywork seen on the GTL, instead using a more stock front and rear ends. According to Malcolm Cracknell's book Taking the World by Storm, there was a shortage of new suitable GT machines at the time, so Lister was allowed to use the Storm despite road car production long since ceasing.

The team announced they would participate in the full FIA GT Championship season under the new GT2 class rules. After a poor start – retiring from fourth place in Monza and retiring from second place at Silverstone – the team managed to take fourth place at Hockenheimring, a mere two laps behind the winning pair of Chrysler Viper GTS-Rs. This was followed by pole position and third place at Zolder, and finally, a second place at Donington, with the Lister finishing a mere 26 seconds behind the winning Viper. These successes brought Lister into a tie for fifth place overall in the teams championship at the season's end, despite only entering half the races. In the 1999 British GT Championship, David Warnock won the GT2 category for Cirtek Motorsport in a Lister Storm GT.

Going into 2000, Lister was more upbeat about their possibilities.  Chrysler-Oreca had officially left the championship, eliminating a challenge from a factory team. Thus, Lister would face competition only from privateers. With this, Lister proved its capabilities by winning the first race of the season at Valencia. Lister would follow this up with four more wins during the season, all claimed by drivers Julian Bailey and Jamie Campbell-Walter. By round seven at the A1 Ring, the team was saddled with a new inlet restrictor to try to slow them down relative to its on-track rivals. With these victories, Lister claimed the team's and driver's championships.

At the same time, Lister competed in the British GT championship both as a factory team, as well as with a customer car for Cirtek Motorsport. The two teams were able to take nine victories. David Warnock finished second overall in the championship using a Storm GT  while Tiff Needell won the races at Circuit de Spa-Francorchamps and Silverstone in the Cirtek (CSi branded) Lister.

Returning as champions to FIA GT, Lister continued into 2001 with two factory cars. Although the Storm GT was very rapid and able to take four victories over the year, the team had to settle for third in the team's championship – beaten by Larbre Competition and Carsport Holland's Vipers. Jamie Campbell-Walter lead the charge, with Tom Coronel as teammate initially. Tom only did a part-season, however, and drivers Mike Jordan, Bobby Verdon-Roe and Richard Dean took it in turns to partner Campbell-Walter's championship efforts. The second car featured Julian Bailey alongside German businessman Nicolaus Springer. This was the last season Julian drove the Lister.

In terms of the 2001 British GT season, Lister won the championship with David Warnock and Mike Jordan at the wheel of a Storm GT, taking victory in no less than seven races. Lister also won the one and only ever race in the Interactive Sportscar Championship 2001 at Donington Park in the hands of James Pickford and David Warnock.

A similar situation occurred in 2002, with Lister managing three victories but only able to take second in the team's championship, again beaten by Larbre. The main challenge this season was relying on a Pro-Am driver strategy across the two cars, as opposed to a Pro-Pro driver line-up by most other teams. The cars were shared by Jamie Campbell-Walter alongside German businessman Nicolaus Springer in car 14 and Bobby Verdon-Roe and British businessman Paul Knapfield in car 15. At times, the amateur drivers would lose one minute to the leaders during their stints. Despite this, Campbell-Walter and Springer finished third overall in the driver's championship. From a British GT point of view, the Storm GT was once again driven by David Warnock and Mike Jordan. This combination delivered 3 race wins and 4 podiums, finishing second in the championship. A great season, but the writing was on the wall for the Lister as the new Saleen S7-R proved to be the dominant vehicle in its first season.

In 2003, Lister was joined in FIA GT with a customer Storm, run by Creation Autosportif. The Lister factory team managed only a single win, yet were still able to take second place in the team's championship. Creation was not far behind, with a fourth-place finish in the championship, after gaining a second customer Storm. At the same time, Lister began work on a new project, the Storm LMP which would bring the marque back to Le Mans. This was, therefore, the beginning of the decline of the Storm GT.

For 2004, Creation Autosportif would take over as the main competitor in FIA GT, with the factory squad appearing only at selected races. Creation managed to take only eighth in the teams championship after the team decided to move to Le Mans Prototypes as well, while the factory squad was only able to score a single point all season.

Lister would continue to attempt to campaign the car into 2005, but was only able to gather enough points for 10th place in the team's championship. Following 2005, the factory officially retired the cars to concentrate on the Storm LMP.

In 2006, French squad Red Racing would purchase a Storm for the FFSA GT Championship. The team would make one attempt at the FIA GT Championship, but failed to make it beyond seven laps in the race at Paul Ricard. As of 2007, there were no Storms racing.

Specifications
 Engine: Jaguar V12 SOHC 24 valves
 Displacement: 7.0 L 
 Compression: 10.5:1
 Power:  at 6,100 rpm
 Torque:  at 3,450 rpm
 Top speed: 
 Coefficient of drag:

References

External links

 Lister Cars

Storm
Grand tourer racing cars
Rear-wheel-drive vehicles
Cars introduced in 1993
Grand tourers
24 Hours of Le Mans race cars